Herman Adam Fink (August 22, 1911 – August 24, 1980) was a Major League Baseball pitcher. He played all or part of three seasons in the majors, from  until , for the Philadelphia Athletics.

Sources

1911 births
1980 deaths
Philadelphia Athletics players
Major League Baseball pitchers
Baseball players from North Carolina
Buffalo Bisons (minor league) players
Birmingham Barons players
Landis Dodgers players
Landis Senators players
Mooresville Moors players
Erwin Aces players
Elmira Pioneers players
Toledo Mud Hens players